is a Japanese politician of the New Komeito Party, a member of the House of Councillors in the Diet (national legislature). A native of Ishioka, Ibaraki and graduate of Tohoku University, he was elected to the House of Councillors for the first time in 1995.

References

External links 
 Official website in Japanese.

Members of the House of Councillors (Japan)
1950 births
Living people
New Komeito politicians
Tohoku University alumni